The history of the metre starts with the Scientific Revolution that is considered to have begun with Nicolaus Copernicus's publication of De revolutionibus orbium coelestium in 1543. Increasingly accurate measurements were required, and scientists looked for measures that were universal and could be based on natural phenomena rather than royal decree or physical prototypes. Rather than the various complex systems of subdivision then in use, they also preferred a decimal system to ease their calculations.

With the French Revolution (1789) came a desire to replace many features of the Ancien Régime, including the traditional units of measure. As a base unit of length, many scientists had favoured the seconds pendulum (a pendulum with a half-period of one second) one century earlier, but this was rejected as it had been discovered that this length varied from place to place with local gravity. A new unit of length, the metre was introduced – defined as one ten-millionth of the shortest distance from the North Pole to the equator passing through Paris, assuming an Earth flattening of 1/334.

For practical purposes however, the standard metre was made available in the form of a platinum bar held in Paris. This in turn was replaced in 1889 at the initiative of the International Geodetic Association by thirty platinum-iridium bars kept across the globe. The comparison of the new prototypes of the metre with each other and with the Committee metre (French: Mètre des Archives) involved the development of specialized measuring equipment and the definition of a reproducible temperature scale. Progress in science finally allowed the definition of the metre to be dematerialized; thus in 1960 a new definition based on a specific number of wavelengths of light from a specific transition in krypton-86 allowed the standard to be universally available by measurement. In 1983 this was updated to a length defined in terms of the speed of light; this definition was reworded in 2019:

The metre, symbol m, is the SI unit of length. It is defined by taking the fixed numerical value of the speed of light in vacuum  to be  when expressed in the unit m⋅s, where the second is defined in terms of the caesium frequency .

During the mid nineteenth century the metre gained adoption worldwide, particularly in scientific usage, and it was officially established as an international measurement unit by the Metre Convention of 1875. Where older traditional length measures are still used, they are now defined in terms of the metre – for example the yard has since 1959 officially been defined as exactly 0.9144 metre.

Universal measure

The standard measures of length in Europe diverged from one another after the fall of the Carolingian Empire (around 888): while measures could be standardised within a given jurisdiction (which was often little more than a single market town), there were numerous variations of measure between regions. Indeed, as the measures were often used as the basis for taxation (of cloth, for example), the use of a particular measure was associated with the sovereignty of a given ruler and often dictated by law.

Nevertheless, with the increasing scientific activity of the 17th century came calls for the institution of a standard measure or "" (as Italian Tito Livio Burattini said), which would be based on natural phenomena rather than royal decree, and would also be decimal rather than using the various systems of subdivision, often duodecimal, which coexisted at the time.

In 1645 Giovanni Battista Riccioli had been the first to determine the length of a "seconds pendulum" (a pendulum with a half-period of one second). In 1671 Jean Picard measured the length of a "seconds pendulum" at the Paris Observatory. He found the value of 440.5 lignes of the Toise of Châtelet (a  [English: fathom] is defined as 6  [foot] or 72  [inches] or 864  [lines]), which had been recently renewed. He proposed a universal  toise  which was twice the length of the seconds pendulum. However, it was soon discovered that the length of a seconds pendulum varies from place to place: French astronomer Jean Richer had measured the 0.3% difference in length between Cayenne (in French Guiana) and Paris.

Jean Richer and Giovanni Domenico Cassini measured the parallax of Mars between Paris and Cayenne in French Guiana when Mars was at its closest to Earth in 1672. They arrived at a figure for the solar parallax of 9.5 arcseconds, equivalent to an Earth–Sun distance of about 22,000 Earth radii. They were also the first astronomers to have access to an accurate and reliable value for the radius of Earth, which had been measured by their colleague Jean Picard in 1669 as 3,269,000 . Isaac Newton used this measurement for establishing his law of universal gravitation. Picard's geodetic observations had been confined to the determination of the magnitude of the earth considered as a sphere, but the discovery made by Jean Richer turned the attention of mathematicians to its deviation from a spherical form. The determination of the figure of the Earth became a problem of the highest importance in astronomy, inasmuch as the diameter of the earth was the unit to which all celestial distances had to be referred.

The French main unit of length was the Toise of Paris whose standard was the Toise of Châtelet which was fixed outside the Grand Châtelet in Paris from 1668 to 1776. In 1735 two geodetic standards were calibrated against the Toise of Châtelet. One of them, the Toise of Peru was used for the French Geodesic Mission to the Equator. In 1766 the Toise of Peru became the official standard of the Toise in France and was renamed as the Toise of the Academy.

In his famous work  ('Theory of the Figure of the Earth, drawn from the Principles of Hydrostatics') published in 1743, Alexis Claude Clairaut synthesized the relationships existing between gravity and the shape of the Earth. Clairaut exposed there his theorem which established a relationship between gravity measured at different latitudes and the flattening of the Earth considered as a spheroid composed of concentric layers of variable densities. Towards the end of the 18th century, the geodesists sought to reconcile the values of flattening drawn from the measurements of meridian arcs with that given by Clairaut's spheroid drawn from the measurement of gravity. In 1789, Pierre-Simon de Laplace obtained by a calculation taking into account the measures of meridian arcs known at the time a flattening of 1/279. Gravimetry gave him a flattening of 1/359. Adrien-Marie Legendre meanwhile found at the same time a flattening of 1/305. The Weights and Measures Commission would adopt in 1799 a flattening of 1/334 by combining the arc of Peru and the data of the meridian of Delambre and Méchain.

Geodetic surveys found practical applications in French cartography and in the Anglo-French Survey, which aimed to connect Paris and Greenwich Observatories and led to the Principal Triangulation of Great Britain. The unit of length used by the French was the Toise de Paris, which was divided in six feet. The English unit of length was the yard, which became the geodetic unit used in the British Empire.

Despite scientific progresses in the field of geodesy, little practical advance was made towards the establishment of the "universal measure" until the French Revolution of 1789. France was particularly affected by the proliferation of length measures, and the need for reform was widely accepted across all political viewpoints, even if it needed the push of revolution to bring it about. Talleyrand resurrected the idea of the seconds pendulum before the Constituent Assembly in 1790, suggesting that the new measure be defined at 45°N (a latitude that, in France, runs just north of Bordeaux and just south of Grenoble): despite the support of the Assembly, nothing came of Talleyrand's proposal.

Meridional definition

The question of measurement reform was placed in the hands of the Academy of Sciences, who appointed a commission chaired by Jean-Charles de Borda. Borda was an avid supporter of decimalisation: he had invented the "repeating circle", a surveying instrument which allowed a much-improved precision in the measurement of angles between landmarks, but insisted that it be calibrated in "grades" ( of a quarter-circle) rather than degrees, with 100 minutes to a grade and 100 seconds to a minute. Borda considered that the seconds pendulum was a poor choice for a standard because the existing second (as a unit of time) was not part of the proposed decimal system of time measurement – a system of 10 hours to the day, 100 minutes to the hour and 100 seconds to the minute – introduced in 1793.

Instead of the seconds pendulum method, the commission – whose members included Lagrange, Laplace, Monge and Condorcet – decided that the new measure should be equal to one ten-millionth of the distance from the North Pole to the Equator (the quadrant of the Earth's circumference), measured along the meridian passing through Paris. Apart from the obvious consideration of safe access for French surveyors, the Paris meridian was also a sound choice for scientific reasons: a portion of the quadrant from Dunkirk to Barcelona (about 1000 km, or one-tenth of the total) could be surveyed with start- and end-points at sea level, and that portion was roughly in the middle of the quadrant, where the effects of the Earth's oblateness were expected to be the largest. The Spanish-French geodetic mission had confirmed that the acceleration of a body near the surface of the Earth is due to the combined effects of gravity and centrifugal acceleration. Indeed, we know now that the resulting acceleration towards the ground is about 0.5% greater at the poles than at the Equator. It follows that the polar diameter of the Earth is smaller than its equatorial diameter. The Academy of Sciences planned to infer the flattening of the Earth from both the length's differences between meridional portions corresponding to one degree of latitude and the variations of gravitational acceleration (see Clairaut's theorem). Jean-Baptiste Biot and François Arago published in 1821 their observations completing those of Delambre and Mechain. It was an account of the length's variation of the degrees of latitude along the Paris meridian as well as the account of the variation of the seconds pendulum's length along the same meridian. The seconds pendulum's length was a means to measure g, the local acceleration resulting from combination of local gravity and centrifugal acceleration, which varies with latitude (see Earth's gravity).

The task of surveying the meridian arc fell to Pierre Méchain and Jean-Baptiste Delambre, and took more than six years (1792–1798). The technical difficulties were not the only problems the surveyors had to face in the convulsed period of the aftermath of the Revolution: Méchain and Delambre, and later Arago, were imprisoned several times during their surveys, and Méchain died in 1804 of yellow fever, which he contracted while trying to improve his original results in northern Spain. In the meantime, the commission calculated a provisional value from older surveys of 443.44 lignes. This value was set by legislation on 7 April 1795.

The project was split into two parts – the northern section of 742.7 km from the belfry, Dunkirk to Rodez Cathedral which was surveyed by Delambre and the southern section of 333.0 km from Rodez to the Montjuïc Fortress, Barcelona which was surveyed by Méchain.

In an operation taking six weeks, the baseline was accurately measured using four platinum rods, each of length two toises (a toise being about 1.949 m). Thereafter he used, where possible, the triangulation points used by Cassini in his 1744 survey of France. Méchain's baseline, of a similar length (6,006.25 toises), and also on a straight section of road between Vernet (in the Perpignan area) and Salces (now Salses-le-Chateau). Although Méchain's sector was half the length of Delambre, it included the Pyrenees and hitherto unsurveyed parts of Spain. An international commission composed of Gabriel Císcar, Jean-Baptiste Delambre, Pierre- Simon Laplace, Adrien-Marie Legendre, Pierre Méchain, Jean Henri van Swinden and Johann Georg Tralles combined the results of the survey with those of the Geodetic Mission to Peru and found a value of 1/334 for the Earth's flattening. They then extrapolated from the measurement of the Paris meridian arc between Dunkirk and Barcelona the distance from the North Pole to the Equator which was 5,130,740 toises. As the metre had to be equal to one ten-millionth of this distance, it was defined as 0.513074 toise or 3 feet and 11.296 lines of the Toise of Peru. Their result came out at 0.144  shorter than the provisional value, a difference of about 0.03%.

While Méchain and Delambre were completing their survey, the commission had ordered a series of platinum bars to be made based on the provisional metre. When the final result was known, the bar whose length was closest to the meridional definition of the metre was selected and placed in the National Archives on 22 June 1799 (4 messidor An VII in the Republican calendar) as a permanent record of the result.

The metric system, that is the system of units based on the metre, was officially adopted in France on 10 December 1799 (19 frimaire An VIII) and became the sole legal system of weights and measures from 1801. In the meantime, the Netherlands had adopted the metric system from 1816. The first of several countries to follow the French lead, the Helvetic Republic had adopted the metre shortly before its collapse in 1803.

With the extension of the survey it became apparent that Méchain and Delambre's result (443.296 ) was slightly too short for the meridional definition of the metre. While the Ordnance Survey extended the British survey northward to the Shetland Islands, Arago and Biot extended the survey southward in Spain to the island of Formentera in the western Mediterranean Sea (1806–1809), and found that one ten-millionth of the Earth's quadrant should be 443.31 : later work increased the value to 443.39 .

Some thought that the base of the metric system could be attacked by pointing out some errors that crept into the measurement of the two French scientists. Méchain had even noticed an inaccuracy he did not dare to admit. Louis Puissant declared in 1836 in front of the French Academy of Sciences that Delambre and Méchain had made an error in the measurement of the French meridian arc. As this survey was also part of the groundwork for the map of France, Antoine Yvon Villarceau checked, from 1861 to 1866, the geodesic opérations in eight points of the meridian arc. Some of the errors in the operations of Delambre and Méchain were then corrected.

In 1866, at the conference of the International Association of Geodesy in Neuchâtel Carlos Ibáñez e Ibáñez de Ibero announced Spain's contribution to the measurement of the French meridian arc. In 1870, François Perrier was in charge of resuming the triangulation between Dunkirk and Barcelona. This new survey of the Paris meridian arc, named West Europe-Africa Meridian-arc by Alexander Ross Clarke, was undertaken in France and in Algeria under the direction of François Perrier from 1870 to his death in 1888. Jean-Antonin-Léon Bassot completed the task in 1896. According to the calculations made at the central bureau of the international association on the great meridian arc extending from the Shetland Islands, through Great Britain, France and Spain to El Aghuat in Algeria, the Earth equatorial radius was 6377935 metres, the ellipticity being assumed as 1/299.15. The modern value, for the WGS 84 reference spheroid with an Earth's flattening of 1/, is  × 107 m for the distance from the North pole to the Equator.

A more accurate determination of the Figure of the Earth resulted also from the measurement of the Struve Geodetic Arc (1816–1855) and would have given another value for the definition of this standard of length. This did not invalidate the metre but highlighted that progresses in science would allow better measurement of Earth's size and shape. The  remained the legal and practical standard for the metre in France, even once it was known that it did not exactly correspond to the meridional definition. When it was decided (in 1867) to create a new international standard metre, the length was taken to be that of the  "in the state in which it shall be found".

One of the significant international use of the meridional definition of the metre was the initial work conducted by the British Association for the Advancement of Science (B.A.) on electrical units which was to lead to the International System of Electrical and Magnetic Units. It was often claimed that the international electrical units formed a coherent set of absolute units in the quadrant-eleventh-gram-second system (aka the "QES system" or "Q.E.S. system"), where the unit length was the quadrant of the Earth's polar circumference, the unit mass was the "eleventh-gram" or 10−11 grams and the unit time was the second. Nevertheless, the precision of absolute electrical measurements in the late nineteenth century was not such that the 0.02% difference in the definitions of the metre had any practical significance.

In 1832, Carl Friedrich Gauss studied the Earth's magnetic field and proposed adding the second to the basic units of the metre and the kilogram in the form of the CGS system (centimetre, gram, second). In 1836, he founded the Magnetischer Verein, the first international scientific association, in collaboration with Alexander von Humboldt and Wilhelm Edouard Weber. Geophysics or the study of the Earth by the means of physics preceded physics and contributed to the development of its methods. It was primarily a natural philosophy whose object was the study of natural phenomena such as the Earth's magnetic field, lightning and gravity. The coordination of the observation of geophysical phenomena in different points of the globe was of paramount importance and was at the origin of the creation of the first international scientific associations. The foundation of the Magnetischer Verein would be followed by that of the International Geodetic Association in Central Europe on the initiative of Johann Jacob Baeyer in 1863, and by that of the International Meteorological Organisation in 1879.

The original predecessor agency of the National Geodetic Survey was the United States Survey of the Coast, created within the United States Department of the Treasury by an Act of Congress on 10 February 1807, to conduct a "Survey of the Coast." The Survey of the Coast, the United States government's first scientific agency, represented the interest of the administration of President Thomas Jefferson in science and the stimulation of international trade by using scientific surveying methods to chart the waters of the United States and make them safe for navigation. A Swiss immigrant with expertise in both surveying and the standardisation of weights and measures, Ferdinand R. Hassler, was selected to lead the Survey.

Hassler submitted a plan for the survey work involving the use of triangulation to ensure scientific accuracy of surveys, but international relations prevented the new Survey of the Coast from beginning its work; the Embargo Act of 1807 brought American overseas trade virtually to a halt only a month after Hassler's appointment and remained in effect until Jefferson left office in March 1809. It was not until 1811 that Jefferson's successor, President James Madison, sent Hassler to Europe to purchase the instruments necessary to conduct the planned survey, as well as standardised weights and measures. Hassler departed on 29 August 1811, but eight months later, while he was in England, the War of 1812 broke out, forcing him to remain in Europe until its conclusion in 1815. Hassler did not return to the United States until 16 August 1815.

The Survey finally began surveying operations in 1816, when Hassler started work in the vicinity of New York City. The first baseline was measured and verified in 1817. The unit of length to which all distances measured in the U. S. coast survey would be referred was the Committee metre (French : Mètre des Archives), of which Ferdinand Rudolph Hassler had brought a copy in the United States in 1805.

In 1835, the invention of the telegraph by Samuel Morse allowed new progresses in the field of geodesy as longitudes were determined with greater accuracy. Moreover, the publication in 1838 of Friedrich Wilhelm Bessel’s Gradmessung in Ostpreussen marked a new era in the science of geodesy. Here was found the method of least squares applied to the calculation of a network of triangles and the reduction of the observations generally. The systematic manner in which all the observations were taken with the view of securing final results of extreme accuracy was admirable. For his survey Bessel used a copy of the Toise of Peru constructed in 1823 by Fortin in Paris.

In 1860, the Russian Government at the instance of Otto Wilhelm von Struve invited the Governments of Belgium, France, Prussia and England to connect their triangulations in order to measure the length of an arc of parallel in latitude 52° and to test the accuracy of the figure and dimensions of the Earth, as derived from the measurements of arc of meridian. In order to combine the measurements it was necessary to compare the geodetic standards of length used in the different countries. The British Government invited those of France, Belgium, Prussia, Russia, India, Australia, Austria, Spain, United States and Cape of Good Hope to send their standards to the Ordnance Survey office in Southampton. Notably the geodetic standards of France, Spain and United States were based on the metric system, whereas those of Prussia, Belgium and Russia where calibrated against the toise, of which the oldest physical representative was the Toise of Peru. The Toise of Peru had been constructed in 1735 as the standard of reference in the Spanish-French Geodesic Mission, conducted in actual Ecuador from 1735 to 1744.

In 1861 Johann Jacob Baeyer published a report suggesting that European countries should cooperate in the determination of the figure of the Earth. In 1862, when Denmark, Saxe-Gotha, the Netherlands, Russia (for Poland), Switzerland, Baden, Saxony, Italy, Austria, Sweden, Norway, Bavaria, Mecklenburg, Hanover and Belgium decided to participate, Bessel's Toise was adopted as international geodetic standard.

As a forerunner in Europe, Spain adopted the metre as geodetic standard. In 1866 Spain joined the geodetic association and was represented by Carlos Ibáñez e Ibáñez de Ibero. He had devised a geodetic standard calibrated against the metre which had been compared to the Toise of Borda (a copy of the Toise of Peru constructed for the measurement of the Paris meridian arc by Delambre and Mechain), which served as a comparison module for the measurement of all geodesic bases in France. A copy of the Spanish metric geodetic standard was made for Egypt. In 1863, Ibáñez and Ismail Effendi Mustafa compared the Spanish Standard with the Egyptian Standard in Madrid. These comparisons were essential, because of the expansibility of solid materials with raise in temperature which had been demonstrated during the 18th century. The famous French physicist and geodesist Pierre Bouguer had exhibited its effect to a large assembly at the Hotel des Invalides. Indeed, one fact had constantly dominated all the fluctuations of ideas on the measurement of geodesic bases: it was the constant concern to accurately assess the temperature of standards in the field; and the determination of this variable, on which depended the length of the instrument of measurement, had always been considered by geodesists as so difficult and so important that one could almost say that the history of measuring instruments is almost identical with that of the precautions taken to avoid temperature errors. Ferdinand Rudolph Hassler's use of the metre in coastal survey, which had been an argument for the introduction of the Metric Act of 1866 allowing the use of the metre in the United States, probably also played a role in the choice of the metre as international scientific unit of length and the proposal, in 1867, by the European Arc Measurement (German: Europäische Gradmessung) to “establish a European international bureau for weights and measures”.
The European Arc Measurement decided the creation of an international geodetic standard for measuring baselines at the General Conference held in Paris in 1875.
The Paris Conference of the European Arc Measurement also dealt with the best instrument to be used for the determination of gravity. After an in-depth discussion in which an American scholar, Charles Sanders Peirce, took part, the association decided in favor of the reversion pendulum, which was used in Switzerland, and it was resolved to redo in Berlin, in the station where Friedrich Wilhelm Bessel made his famous measurements, the determination of gravity by means of apparatus of various kinds employed in different countries, in order to compare them and thus to have the equation of their scales.

The progresses of metrology combined with those of gravimetry through improvement of Kater's pendulum led to a new era of geodesy. If precision metrology had needed the help of geodesy, it could not continue to prosper without the help of metrology. Indeed, how to express all the measurements of terrestrial arcs as a function of a single unit, and all the determinations of the force of gravity with the pendulum, if metrology had not created a common unit, adopted and respected by all civilized nations, and if in addition one had not compared, with great precision, to the same unit all the rulers for measuring geodesic bases, and all the pendulum rods that had hitherto been used or would be used in the future? Only when this series of metrological comparisons would be finished with a probable error of a thousandth of a millimetre would geodesy be able to link the works of the different nations with one another, and then proclaim the result of the measurement of the Globe.

The reversible pendulum built by the Repsold brothers was used in Switzerland in 1865 by Émile Plantamour for the measurement of gravity in six stations of the Swiss geodetic network. Following the example set by this country and under the patronage of the International Geodetic Association, Austria, Bavaria, Prussia, Russia and Saxony undertook gravity determinations on their respective territories. As the figure of the Earth could be inferred from variations of the seconds pendulum length with latitudes, the United States Coast Survey's direction instructed Charles Sanders Peirce in the spring of 1875 to proceed to Europe for the purpose of making pendulum experiments to chief initial stations for operations of this sort, in order to bring the determinations of the forces of gravity in America into communication with those of other parts of the world; and also for the purpose of making a careful study of the methods of pursuing these researches in the different countries of Europe.

In 1886 the association changed name for the International Geodetic Association (German: Internationale Erdmessung). After the death of Johann Jacob Baeyer, Carlos Ibáñez e Ibáñez de Ibero became the first president of the International Geodetic Association from 1887 to his death in 1891. During this period the International Geodetic Association gained worldwide importance with the joining of United States, Mexico, Chile, Argentina and Japan.

Efforts to supplement the various national surveying systems, which began in the 19th century with the foundation of the Mitteleuropäische Gradmessung, resulted in a series of global ellipsoids of the Earth (e.g., Helmert 1906, Hayford 1910/1924) which would later lead to develop the World Geodetic System. Nowadays the practical realisation of the metre is possible everywhere thanks to the atomic clocks embedded in GPS satellites.

International prototype metre

The intimate relationships that necessarily existed between metrology and geodesy explain that the International Association of Geodesy, founded to combine and use the geodetic works of different countries, in order to reach a new and more exact determination of the shape and dimensions of the Globe, gave birth to the idea of reforming the foundations of the metric system, while expanding it and making it international. Not, as it was mistakenly assumed for a certain time, that the Association had the unscientific thought of modifying the length of the metre, in order to conform exactly to its historical definition according to the new values that would be found for the terrestrial meridian. But, busy combining the arcs measured in the different countries and connecting the neighbouring triangulations, geodesists encountered, as one of the main difficulties, the unfortunate uncertainty which reigned over the equations of the units of length used. Adolphe Hirsch, General Baeyer and Colonel Ibáñez decided, in order to make all the standards comparable, to propose to the Association to choose the metre for geodetic unit, and to create an international prototype metre differing as little as possible from the mètre des Archives.

In 1867, the European Arc Measurement (German: Europäische Gradmessung) called for the creation of a new, international prototype metre (IPM) and the arrangement of a system where national standards could be compared with it. The French government gave practical support to the creation of an International Metre Commission, which met in Paris in 1870 and again in 1872 with the participation of about thirty countries. At the session on 12 October, Carlos Ibáñez e Ibáñez de Ibero was elected president of the Permanent Committee of the International Metre Commission, which was to become the International Committee for Weights and Measures (ICWM).

The Metre Convention was signed on 20 May 1875 in Paris and the International Bureau of Weights and Measures was created under the supervision of the International Committee for Weights and Measures. Carlos Ibáñez e Ibáñez de Ibero's presidency was confirmed at the first meeting of the International Committee for Weights and Measures, on 19 April 1875. Three other members of the committee, the German astronomer, Wilhelm Foerster, the Swiss meteorologist and physicist, Heinrich von Wild representing Russia, and the Swiss geodesist of German origin, Adolphe Hirsch were also among the main architects of the Metre Convention.

In recognition of France's role in designing the metric system, the BIPM is based in Sèvres, just outside Paris.

In 1889 the General Conference on Weights and Measures met at Sèvres, the seat of the International Bureau. It performed the first great deed dictated by the motto inscribed in the pediment of the splendid edifice that is the metric system: "A tous les temps, a tous les peuples" (For all times, to all peoples); and this deed consisted in the approval and distribution, among the governments of the states supporting the Metre Convention, of prototype standards of hitherto unknown precision intended to propagate the metric unit throughout the whole world.

For metrology the matter of expansibility was fundamental; as a matter of fact the temperature measuring error related to the length measurement in proportion to the expansibility of the standard and the constantly renewed efforts of metrologists to protect their measuring instruments against the interfering influence of temperature revealed clearly the importance they attached to the expansion-induced errors. It was common knowledge, for instance, that effective measurements were possible only inside a building, the rooms of which were well protected against the changes in outside temperature, and the very presence of the observer created an interference against which it was often necessary to take strict precautions. Thus, the Contracting States also received a collection of thermometers whose accuracy made it possible to ensure that of length measurements. The international prototype would also be a "line standard"; that is, the metre was defined as the distance between two lines marked on the bar, so avoiding the wear problems of end standards.

The construction of the international prototype metre and the copies which were the national standards was at the limits of the technology of the time. The bars were made of a special alloy, 90% platinum and 10% iridium, which was significantly harder than pure platinum, and have a special X-shaped cross section (a "Tresca section", named after French engineer Henri Tresca) to minimise the effects of torsional strain during length comparisons. The first castings proved unsatisfactory, and the job was given to the London firm of Johnson Matthey who succeeded in producing thirty bars to the required specification. The other bars, duly calibrated against the international prototype, were distributed to the signatory nations of the Metre Convention for use as national standards. For example, the United States received No. 27 with a calibrated length of  (1.6 μm short of the international prototype).

The comparison of the new prototypes of the metre with each other and with the Committee metre (French: Mètre des Archives) involved the development of a special measuring equipment and the definition of a reproducible temperature scale. The first (and only) follow-up comparison of the national standards with the international prototype was carried out between 1921 and 1936, and indicated that the definition of the metre was preserved to within 0.2 μm. At this time, it was decided that a more formal definition of the metre was required (the 1889 decision had said merely that the "prototype, at the temperature of melting ice, shall henceforth represent the metric unit of length"), and this was agreed at the 7th CGPM in 1927.

The BIPM's thermometry work led to the discovery of special alloys of iron-nickel, in particular invar, for which its director, the Swiss physicist Charles-Édouard Guillaume, was granted the Nobel Prize for Physics in 1920. In 1900, the International Committee for Weights and Measures responded to a request from the International Association of geodesy and included in the work program of the International Bureau of Weights and Measures the study of measurements by invar's wires. Edvard Jäderin, a Swedish geodesist, had invented a method of measuring geodetic bases, based on the use of taut wires under a constant effort. However, before the discovery of invar, this process was much less precise than the classic method. Charles-Édouard Guillaume demonstrated the effectiveness of Jäderin's method, improved by the use of invar's threads. He measured a base in the Simplon Tunnel in 1905. The accuracy of the measurements was equal to that of the old methods, while the speed and ease of the measurements were incomparably higher.

Interferometric options

The first interferometric measurements carried out using the international prototype metre were those of Albert A. Michelson and Jean-René Benoît (1892–1893) and of Benoît, Fabry and Perot (1906), both using the red line of cadmium. These results, which gave the wavelength of the cadmium line (λ ≈ 644 nm), led to the definition of the ångström as a secondary unit of length for spectroscopic measurements, first by the International Union for Cooperation in Solar Research (1907) and later by the CIPM (1927). Michelson's work in "measuring" the prototype metre to within  of a wavelength ( μm) was one of the reasons for which he was awarded the Nobel Prize in Physics in 1907.

By the 1950s, interferometry had become the method of choice for precise measurements of length, but there remained a practical problem imposed by the system of units used. The natural unit for expressing a length measured by interferometry was the ångström, but this result then had to be converted into metres using an experimental conversion factor – the wavelength of light used, but measured in metres rather than in ångströms. This added an additional measurement uncertainty to any length result in metres, over and above the uncertainty of the actual interferometric measurement.

The solution was to define the metre in the same manner as the angstrom had been defined in 1907, that is in terms of the best interferometric wavelength available. Advances in both experimental technique and theory showed that the cadmium line was actually a cluster of closely separated lines, and that this was due to the presence of different isotopes in natural cadmium (eight in total). To get the most precisely defined line, it was necessary to use a monoisotopic source and this source should contain an isotope with even numbers of protons and neutrons (so as to have zero nuclear spin).

Several isotopes of cadmium, krypton and mercury both fulfil the condition of zero nuclear spin and have bright lines in the visible region of the spectrum.

Krypton standard
Krypton is a gas at room temperature, allowing for easier isotopic enrichment and lower operating temperatures for the lamp (which reduces broadening of the line due to the Doppler effect), and so it was decided to select the orange line of krypton-86 (λ ≈ 606 nm) as the new wavelength standard.

Accordingly, the 11th CGPM in 1960 agreed a new definition of the metre:

The measurement of the wavelength of the krypton line was not made directly against the international prototype metre; instead, the ratio of the wavelength of the krypton line to that of the cadmium line was determined in vacuum. This was then compared to the 1906 Fabry–Perot determination of the wavelength of the cadmium line in air (with a correction for the refractive index of air). In this way, the new definition of the metre was traceable to both the old prototype metre and the old definition of the angstrom.

Speed of light standard

The krypton-86 discharge lamp operating at the triple point of nitrogen (63.14 K, −210.01 °C) was the state-of-the-art light source for interferometry in 1960, but it was soon to be superseded by a new invention: the laser, of which the first working version was constructed in the same year as the redefinition of the metre. Laser light is usually highly monochromatic, and is also coherent (all the light has the same phase, unlike the light from a discharge lamp), both of which are advantageous for interferometry.

The shortcomings of the krypton standard were demonstrated by the measurement of the wavelength of the light from a methane-stabilised helium–neon laser (λ ≈ 3.39 μm). The krypton line was found to be asymmetrical, so different wavelengths could be found for the laser light depending on which point on the krypton line was taken for reference. The asymmetry also affected the precision to which the wavelengths could be measured.

Developments in electronics also made it possible for the first time to measure the frequency of light in or near the visible region of the spectrum, instead of inferring the frequency from the wavelength and the speed of light. Although visible and infrared frequencies were still too high to be directly measured, it was possible to construct a "chain" of laser frequencies that, by suitable multiplication, differ from each other by only a directly measurable frequency in the microwave region. The frequency of the light from the methane-stabilised laser was found to be  THz.

Independent measurements of frequency and wavelength are, in effect, a measurement of the speed of light (c = fλ), and the results from the methane-stabilised laser gave the value for the speed of light with an uncertainty almost 100 times lower than previous measurements in the microwave region. Or, somewhat inconveniently, the results gave two values for the speed of light, depending on which point on the krypton line was chosen to define the metre. This ambiguity was resolved in 1975, when the 15th CGPM approved a conventional value of the speed of light as exactly .

Nevertheless, the infrared light from a methane-stabilised laser was inconvenient for use in practical interferometry. It was not until 1983 that the chain of frequency measurements reached the 633 nm line of the helium–neon laser, stabilised using molecular iodine. That same year, the 17th CGPM adopted a definition of the metre, in terms of the 1975 conventional value for the speed of light:

This definition was reworded in 2019:

The metre, symbol m, is the SI unit of length. It is defined by taking the fixed numerical value of the speed of light in vacuum  to be  when expressed in the unit m⋅s, where the second is defined in terms of the caesium frequency .

The concept of defining a unit of length in terms of a time received some comment. In both cases, the practical issue is that time can be measured more accurately than length (one part in 1013 for a second using a caesium clock as opposed to four parts in 109 for the metre in 1983). The definition in terms of the speed of light also means that the metre can be realised using any light source of known frequency, rather than defining a "preferred" source in advance. Given that there are more than 22,000 lines in the visible spectrum of iodine, any of which could be potentially used to stabilise a laser source, the advantages of flexibility are obvious.

History of definitions since 1798

See also
Length measurement
History of geodesy

Notes

References

External links
 

Metre
History of measurement